Stockbridge Common Marsh is a  biological Site of Special Scientific Interest south of Stockbridge in Hampshire. It is owned by the National Trust.

This site stretches for  along the flood plain of the River Test. It has wetland habitats including marsh, fen, carr, alluvial meadows and a large shallow lake. The marsh has a rich variety of flora, with 180 species of flowering plants, including bog pimpernel, adder’s-tongue fern,  marsh  valerian and bogbean.

References

 
Sites of Special Scientific Interest in Hampshire
National Trust properties in Hampshire